Alberto Ribeiro (1920–2000) was a Portuguese singer and film actor. He starred alongside Amália Rodrigues in the 1947 musical film Black Capes.

Selected filmography
 Gentleman Thief (1944)
 Black Capes (1947)

References

Bibliography
 Creekmur, Corey K. The International Film Musical. Oxford University Press, 2012.

External links

1920 births
2000 deaths
20th-century Portuguese male singers
Portuguese male film actors
20th-century Portuguese male actors